Wolfgang Reichmann (7 January 1932 – 7 May 1991) was a German actor. He appeared in more than 60 films and television shows between 1954 and 1991. He starred in the film The Fair, which was entered into the 10th Berlin International Film Festival.

Filmography

References

External links
 

1932 births
1991 deaths
German male film actors
German male television actors
People from Bytom
People from the Province of Upper Silesia
20th-century German male actors